Anglo-French alliance may refer to:

Treaty of Paris (1657), an alliance against Spain
Anglo-French Alliance (1716–31), another alliance against Spain
Anglo-French blockade of the Río de la Plata (1845-1850)
 Anglo-French joint invasion of Qing Dynasty during the Second Opium War (1856–1860)
Entente Cordiale (1904) fought together in both World Wars